The 2001 McNeese State Cowboys football team was an American football team that represented McNeese State University as a member of the Southland Conference (Southland) during the 2001 NCAA Division I-AA football season. In their second year under head coach Tommy Tate, the team compiled an overall record of 8–4, with a mark of 5–1 in conference play, and finished as co-champion in the Southland. The Cowboys advanced to the NCAA Division I-AA Football Championship playoffs and lost to Maine in the first round.

Schedule

References

McNeese State
McNeese Cowboys football seasons
Southland Conference football champion seasons
McNeese State Cowyboys football